The 1978 Uber Cup was the 9th edition of the Uber Cup, the women's badminton team competition. The tournament took place in the 1977-78 badminton season, 15 countries competed. Japan won its fourth title in the Uber Cup, after beating Indonesia in the Final Round in Auckland.

Qualifying

Asian Zone

First qualifying round

Final qualifying round

European Zone

First qualifying round

Second qualifying round

Third qualifying round

Final qualifying round

Pan American Zone

Final qualifying round

Final Tournament

First round

Second round

Grand Final

References

Thomas & Uber Cup
1978 in badminton
1978 in New Zealand sport
Badminton tournaments in New Zealand